August Meesen was a Belgian wrestler. He competed in the men's Greco-Roman light heavyweight at the 1908 Summer Olympics.

References

External links

Year of birth missing
Year of death missing
Belgian male sport wrestlers
Olympic wrestlers of Belgium
Wrestlers at the 1908 Summer Olympics
Place of birth missing